Only One Love in My Life is the ninth studio album by American country music artist Ronnie Milsap. The album produced two #1 hits for Milsap in the US, including the title track, which also peaked at #63 on the Billboard Hot 100. "Let's Take the Long Way Around the World," was the other #1 single. "Back on My Mind Again" also was released as a single, reaching #2 on country charts.

Only One Love in My Life reached #3 on Country album charts and reached the Billboard 200, peaking at #109. It was ultimately certified as Gold.

Track listing

Chart

Weekly charts

Year-end charts

Singles

References

1978 albums
Ronnie Milsap albums
RCA Records albums
Albums produced by Tom Collins (record producer)